I Don't Wanna Grow Up is the debut extended play (EP) by American singer Bebe Rexha. It was released on May 12, 2015, by Warner Bros. Records.

Background 
Rexha was a part of music duo Black Cards with Pete Wentz, before she began recording her first solo single for her first EP, called "I Can't Stop Drinking About You". "I Can't Stop Drinking About You" was released on April 29, 2014. Since releasing her first solo single, Rexha also appeared on some tracks on Pitbull's album, Globalization (2014), while she was writing and performing as part of the chorus for "Hey Mama" by David Guetta.

In December 2014, the singer published a demo of a track, called "Cry Wolf". The track was first rumored to be her new single. However, four days later, the singer revealed that her next single would be called "I'm Gonna Show You Crazy". The song was finally released a week, after it was previewed on December 19, 2014.

Critical reception 
Upon the release, I Don't Wanna Grow Up was reviewed by ArtistDirect, with Rick Florino describing the EP as "unabashedly fun yet starkly emotional" with everything being a "delicate balance of hypnotic honesty and heartfelt hookiness, separating her from the pack".  With respect to the song "Pray", her vocal range is portrayed as "downright impressive as she hits expansive runs and high notes, carrying these sorts of cleverly confessional lines". Robbie Daw of Idolator stated that the song "Pray" "displays perhaps a more emotional side of Bebe than we’ve heard in her past single releases".

Tour 
To support the release of her first EP, Rexha performed across Europe; in addition, singing as part of the Warped Tour.

Track listing

Release history

References 

2015 debut EPs
Bebe Rexha albums
Albums produced by Jon Levine